Al-Hamd Islamic University is a private university located in the downtown area of Quetta, Balochistan, Pakistan. The Al-Hamd Islamic University is recognized by Higher Education Commission of Pakistan and it is conceived by Alhamd Educational System (AES). The Alhamd Educational System which was established in 1995 is also operating some other institution like: Balochistan Institute of Technology, BIT Girls College, Dar-e-Arqam School of Islam and Modern Sciences, Dar-e-Arqam Girls College, and Quran Research Academy. The university was established in 2005 under the act of The Al-Hamd Islamic University, Quetta. Act 2005 by Balochistan Assembly.

Departments
 Department of Technology
 Department of Electronics
 Department of Social Sciences
 Department of Education
 Department of Commerce
 Department of Management Sciences
 Department of Computer Sciences
 Department of Islamic Studies

See also
 List of universities in Pakistan

References

External links
 

Private universities and colleges in Pakistan
Universities and colleges in Balochistan, Pakistan
Educational institutions established in 2005
2005 establishments in Pakistan
Universities and colleges in Quetta District
Islamic universities and colleges in Pakistan